The Picture of Dorian Gray is an 1890 novel by Oscar Wilde.

The Picture of Dorian Gray may also refer to:

Films 
 The Picture of Dorian Gray (1915 film), an American film directed by Eugene Moore
 The Picture of Dorian Grey (1915 film), a Russian film directed by Vsevolod Meyerhold 
 The Picture of Dorian Gray (1916 film), a British film directed by Fred W. Durrant
 The Picture of Dorian Gray (1917 German film), a German film directed by Richard Oswald 
 The Picture of Dorian Gray (1917 Hungarian film), a Hungarian film directed by Alfréd Deésy
 The Picture of Dorian Gray (1945 film), an American film directed by Albert Lewin
 The Picture of Dorian Gray (1973 film), an American television film directed by Glenn Jordan
 The Picture of Dorian Gray (2004 film), an American film starring Josh Duhamel

Songs 
 "The Picture of Dorian Gray", a song by Nirvana (UK)
 "A Picture of Dorian Gray", a song by Television Personalities from ...And Don't the Kids Just Love It

Other uses 
 The Picture of Dorian Gray (telenovela), a 1969 Mexican telenovela
 The Picture of Dorian Gray (1976 TV), a BBC Play of the Month production directed by John Gorrie
 The Picture of Dorian Gray (opera), a 1996 opera by Lowell Liebermann

See also 
 Adaptations of The Picture of Dorian Gray, for further films, books, plays and musicals based on the novel
 Dorian Gray (disambiguation)